The 1916 Oregon Webfoots football team represented the University of Oregon in the 1916 college football season. It was the Webfoots' 24th overall and first season as a member of the Pacific Coast Conference (PCC). The team was led by head coach Hugo Bezdek, in his fourth year, and played their home games at Kincaid Field in Eugene and at Multnomah Field in Portland.

Oregon finished the season with a record of seven wins, zero losses and one tie (7–0–1 overall, 2–0–1 in the PCC) and with a victory over Penn in the Rose Bowl on New Year's Day.

This was first Oregon football team to play to the school's Mighty Oregon fight song, which was first performed on January 7, 1916.

In 2016 the Oregon Ducks wore Webfoot throwback jerseys in their game vs. Washington to celebrate the 100th anniversary of both the fight song and the 1916 squad.

Schedule

Personnel

Roster

Depth chart

Game summaries

Willamette

In their first game of the season the Webfoots defeated the Willamette Methodists by a massive margin of 97–0.

Multnomah Athletic Club

In their second game of the season the Webfoots defeated the Multnomah Athletic Club 28–0, recording their second shutout in as many games.

California

In their first conference game of the season the Webfoots defeated the California Golden Bears 39–14, allowing their only two touchdowns of the season during the game.

Washington

In their first home conference game of the season the Webfoots tied with the Washington Huskies while playing in a heavy downpour that muddied the field.

Washington State

Oregon Agricultural

Multnomah Athletic Club

Penn – 3rd Rose Bowl

References

Oregon
Oregon Ducks football seasons
Rose Bowl champion seasons
College football undefeated seasons
Oregon Webfoots football